Seyed Mohammad Hossein Adeli (born in 1953 in Ahvaz) is an Iranian politician, diplomat, economist and academic. He was the Secretary General of the Gas Exporting Countries Forum from 2014 until 2018. He is the founder of Ravand Institute. He was the chairman of Iran's first Investment Bank Amin Investment Bank until 2011. In May 2014, he received the Order of the Rising Sun from the Emperor of Japan, Akihito, the highest Order given to any Iranian National for his important role in the Iran–Japan Relation.

Personal life and education
Hossein Adeli is one of the few Iranian politicians to have an international background, having studied Business Administration at Tehran Business School, he continued his Masters in International Economics at University of Tehran before earning his Doctor of Business Administration in California Coast University. He attended his Ph.D. courses in Stony Brook University and New School University. He obtained his second Ph.D. in Economics from Jamia Millia Islamia.

Political and academic career

Adeli was educated in Dar ul-Funun (Persian: دار الفنون ) in Tehran. Beginning his career teaching at various universities in Tehran, at age of 27 he became the Director General of the Economic Affairs Department in Iranian Ministry of Foreign Affairs. Five years later, he became special advisor to the Foreign Ministry. In the following year, he acted as advisor to the Minister of Petroleum.  Adeli went on to represent Iran at various OPEC meetings. Adeli is one of the only dignitaries of the Islamic Republic to have actively participated to the World Economic Forum activities.

Diplomatic career
Adeli’s diplomatic career began with his appointment as Iran’s Ambassador to Japan between 1986 and 1989, during which he played a key role in revitalising Iranian and Japanese business/political relations. While he was in office, Hirohito, the 124th Emperor of Japan who ruled for over 60 years died on January 7, 1989, and his imperial funeral was held on the next month. On February 24, Adeli and his wife attended the Rites of Imperial Funeral with Mostafa Mir-Salim, Vice President and Hossein Saffar Harandi, a Member of Parliament and the Chairman of Parliament Committee on Agriculture.

Soon thereafter, at the age of 36 he was appointed Governor of Central Bank of Iran.  Adeli is credited a pioneer of the economic reform package during the critical years of reconstruction following the Iraq-Iran War.

Adeli’s diplomatic career progressed through his appointment as Iranian Ambassador to Canada in 1995. At the end of his term in 1999, Adeli was nominated as Deputy Foreign Minister for Economic Affairs and the chairman of the Coordinating Council for Foreign Economic Relations until 2004.  During these years, Adeli initiated two special committees for Reconstruction of Afghanistan and Reconstruction of Iraq through a series of multilateral arrangements, and filled the role of secretary general for both committees.

As his last official post, he served as Ambassador Extraordinary Plenipotentiary of Iran to the United Kingdom. At his time, he along with John Curtis and several others lobbied with Iranian Government to borrow 80 items for a new exhibition named "The Forgotten Empire".

Career in Energy

Having served in the Ministry of Oil as international advisor. He has been the advocate and chief negotiator of many energy plans and projects, including the following:
 Iran-Pakistan-India pipeline; where he served as the co-chair of the joint commission of Iran, Pakistan and India.
 Iran-Armenia Gas pipeline; headed the gas diplomacy for this project
 Iran-EU energy cooperation; for which he negotiated for establishment of Iran-EU energy center in Iran, and headed the team to engage with Nabucco project to export gas to EU.
 Iran Gas cooperation with southern neighbors; where he led the talks with Kuwait and Saudi Arabia for development of Arash field in the Persian Gulf and the export of gas to KSA
 Iran-CIS gas and Oil cooperation; gas cooperation with Turkmenistan, Azerbaijan, and Kazakhstan.

Awards and recognition

Adeli has also been active in regional and international groups and organisations, including the D-8, the G15, the Indian Ocean Rim Association for Regional Cooperation and the European Union. He has received many awards including a distinction by the Economic Cooperation Organization Secretary General for "Special Recognition and Appreciation" for his contribution and proposition of the name ECO. He also won the Crans-Montana Development and Peace Award in 2002 in Geneva.

Adeli has also received special recognition for various activities including: spearheading monetary reforms as Central Bank Governor; innovation of a new Islamic banking financial instrument called "Participation Paper", now widely used in Iran and other Islamic countries under the name of Sukuk; initiating the law for Official Development Assistance of Iran which aims to contribute to the development of least developing countries; initiating Economic Diplomacy for the first time in Iran; initiating Economic partnership with Africa through Iran–Africa economic summit; being head of Coordination for assistance to Iraqi reconstruction, and Coordination for assisting Afghanistan reconstruction through international organization. He has been a frequent guest speaker at many international conferences, including OPEC, South-South Cooperation, United Nations, World Economic Forum, Islamic Banking and Finance, World Bank, International Trade Centre and International Monetary Fund as well as major investment banks such as Goldman Sachs.

Creation of Ravand Institute

After leaving the government, Adeli founded the Ravand Institute for Economic and International Studies, Iran’s first private non-governmental, non-partisan research centre (think-thank). He is the founder of Ravand Institute.

References

1953 births
Living people
People from Ahvaz
21st-century Iranian diplomats
20th-century Iranian economists
Ambassadors of Iran to Japan
Ambassadors of Iran to Canada
Ambassadors of Iran to the United Kingdom
Executives of Construction Party politicians
Governors of the Central Bank of Iran
University of Tehran alumni
California Coast University alumni
Stony Brook University alumni
The New School alumni
Jamia Millia Islamia alumni
21st-century Iranian economists
20th-century Iranian diplomats